Oleksandr Pavlovych Liashko (December 30, 1915 — October 9, 2002) was a Ukrainian and Soviet politician. He was the Chairman of the Council of Ministers of Ukrainian SSR (today's equivalent of prime-minister) for more than 15 years, making him the longest-serving person in that capacity.
He joined the Communist Party in 1942 and served in the Central Committee of the Communist Party of the Soviet Union from 1961 to 1989. In 1985 Liashko received the honorary award, the Hero of Socialist Labour.

Biography
Oleksandr Liashko was born in a family of a railway worker in a small village in Luhansk Oblast, eastern Ukraine. He studied at technical school and matriculated at Donetsk Industrial Institute in 1937.

Together with his classmates in the summer of 1941 he was sent as a cadet to the 2nd Kharkiv Tank School. After graduating from the school in 1942, he received the rank of lieutenant and was sent to the Gorky Automobile Plant, which then began to produce tanks. Member of the CPSU (b) since 1942.

The platoon commanded by O. Lyashko received combat vehicles and was transferred to the North Caucasus Front. After a well-organized repair of military equipment in 1943, he returned to the tank school, where he taught special subjects until the end of the war.

memorial plaque on the building of DonNTU

From 1945 he worked as an engineer on the equipment of the open-hearth shop at the Novokramatorsk Machine-Building Plant of the Stalin Region. At the same time, he studied at the Donetsk Industrial Institute, graduating in 1947 with a degree in metallurgical and mechanical engineering.

From 1947 he was deputy head of the transport department, deputy director, and from 1951 he was a party member of the Central Committee of the CPSU (b) at the New Kramatorsk Machinebuilding Factory in the Stalin Region.

From August 1952 to 1954 he was the first secretary of the Kramatorsk city committee of the Communist Party of Stalin's region.

From 1954 to 1957 he was secretary of the Stalinist regional committee of the Communist Party. From 1957 to March 1, 1960, he was the second secretary of the Stalinist regional committee of the Communist Party.

March 1, 1960 — January 1963 — First Secretary of the Stalin (Donetsk) Regional Committee of the Communist Party. In January — July 11, 1963 — First Secretary of the Donetsk Regional Industrial Committee of the Communist Party.

July 2, 1963 — March 18, 1966 — Secretary of the Central Committee of the Communist Party of Ukraine, Chairman of the Bureau of the Central Committee of the Communist Party for Industry and Construction.

March 18, 1966 — June 19, 1969 — 2nd Secretary of the Central Committee of the Communist Party.

June 20, 1969 — June 9, 1972 — Chairman of the Presidium of the Verkhovna Rada of the Ukrainian SSR.

From June 9, 1972 — Chairman of the Council of Ministers of the Ukrainian SSR. In May 1986, he headed the Republican Government Commission for the Elimination of the Consequences of the Chernobyl Accident. On July 10, 1987, the fifth session of the Verkhovna Rada of the Ukrainian SSR relieved O. Lyashko of his duties as Chairman of the Council of Ministers of the Ukrainian SSR.

Since 1987 he has been a personal pensioner of union significance in Kyiv.

He was married to Davydova Klavdia Andriivna, had two children — Lyashko Volodymyr Oleksandrovych and Lyashko Nina Oleksandrivna.

Author of three books of memoirs: "The Way of Survival", "The Way to the Nomenclature" (1997), "On the Steps of Power" (2001).

He died on October 9, 2002. He was buried in Kyiv at the Baikove Cemetery.

Awards
Oleksandr Liashko was awarded the Hero of Socialist Labour in 1985. During his public service he also received numerous other civil and state awards and recognitions, including the Order of Lenin (in 1965, 1971, 1973, 1975, 1977 and 1985), the Order of the Red Banner of Labour (in 1957 and 1958), the Order of the Patriotic War, I class (in 1985) and the Order of Prince Yaroslav the Wise, V class (in 2000).

References

External links
Profile at the Handbook on history of the Communist Party and the Soviet Union 1898–1991

1915 births
2002 deaths
People from Luhansk Oblast
People from Yekaterinoslav Governorate
Ukrainian people in the Russian Empire
Central Committee of the Communist Party of the Soviet Union members
Communist Party of Ukraine (Soviet Union) politicians
Politburo of the Central Committee of the Communist Party of Ukraine (Soviet Union) members
Presidium of the Supreme Soviet
Sixth convocation members of the Soviet of the Union
Seventh convocation members of the Soviet of the Union
Eighth convocation members of the Soviet of Nationalities
Ninth convocation members of the Soviet of the Union
Tenth convocation members of the Soviet of the Union
Eleventh convocation members of the Soviet of the Union
Head of Presidium of the Verkhovna Rada of the Ukrainian Soviet Socialist Republic
Chairpersons of the Council of Ministers of Ukraine
Heroes of Socialist Labour
Recipients of the Order of Lenin
Recipients of the Order of Prince Yaroslav the Wise, 5th class
Fifth convocation members of the Verkhovna Rada of the Ukrainian Soviet Socialist Republic
Seventh convocation members of the Verkhovna Rada of the Ukrainian Soviet Socialist Republic
Eighth convocation members of the Verkhovna Rada of the Ukrainian Soviet Socialist Republic
Ninth convocation members of the Verkhovna Rada of the Ukrainian Soviet Socialist Republic
Tenth convocation members of the Verkhovna Rada of the Ukrainian Soviet Socialist Republic
Eleventh convocation members of the Verkhovna Rada of the Ukrainian Soviet Socialist Republic
21st-century Ukrainian politicians
Recipients of the Order of Bohdan Khmelnytsky, 3rd class
Recipients of the Honorary Diploma of the Cabinet of Ministers of Ukraine